Late Night Tales: Music for Pleasure is a DJ mix album by Groove Armada's Tom Findlay for Late Night Tales series, released by Night Time Stories on 11 June 2012. The album features tracks by yacht rock artists such as Toto, Hall & Oates, and Kenny Loggins, among many others.

Reception
Pitchfork'''s Mark Richardson wrote that "despite the familiarity and easily parodied context of the source material, [the album] works; it does what it was designed to do, probably due to the fact that recording and record-making were at their technological zenith in the late 70s and early 80s."

Track listing
 "You're the Only Woman (You & I)" – Ambrosia
 "Every Kinda People" – Robert Palmer
 "I Keep Forgettin' (Every Time You're Near)" – Michael McDonald
 "Georgy Porgy" – Toto
 "What You Won't Do for Love" – Bobby Caldwell
 "Baby Come Back" – Player
 "Fly Like an Eagle" – Steve Miller Band
 "Get it Up for Love" – Ned Doheny
 "Work to Do" – Average White Band
 "Lowdown" – Boz Scaggs
 "How Long" – Sugardaddy
 "Showdown" – Electric Light Orchestra
 "Get It Right Next Time" – Gerry Rafferty
 "It Keeps You Runnin'" – The Doobie Brothers
 "I’m Just a Kid (Don’t Make Me Feel Like a Man)" – Hall & Oates
 "The Guitar Man" – Bread
 "Be Nice to Me" – Todd Rundgren
 "I'm Not in Love" – 10cc

References

External links
 Music For Pleasure'' at Late Night Tales

Music For Pleasure
2012 compilation albums